The Mystery Files of Shelby Woo is a children's mystery television series that ran on Nickelodeon between 1996 and 1999. A total of 41 episodes of 30 minutes each were produced. Episodes from the first three seasons were taped at Nickelodeon Studios at Universal Studios in Orlando, Florida, and was one of the few single-camera productions there, while the final season's episodes were shot in Montreal, Quebec, Canada.

History 
The series first aired in March 1996 as a six-episode test run, since Nickelodeon usually produced one major new series at a time and they were already producing Space Cases. The success of the test run prompted Nickelodeon to re-introduce the series on SNICK in January 1997, along with seven new episodes. During the show's third season, production stopped after eight of a proposed thirteen episodes were filmed due to a crew strike, as the show's budget did not cover the International Alliance of Theatrical Stage Employees's demands, partly due to the decision to shoot film instead of videotape. Production resumed in Montreal in February 1998, after Cinar agreed to co-produce the series. As a result, the show's setting changed from Cocoa Beach, Florida to Boston, Massachusetts.

Starring Irene Ng as the title character, the series revolves around the adventures of a Chinese American teenage girl who lives with her innkeeper grandfather and works as a non-sworn intern at the local police department where she helps out with odds and ends around the office. Occasionally an intriguing case comes to Shelby's attention, prompting her to apply her unique insight and enlist the help of her friends to solve it. Her supervisors, however, do not appreciate her help, as she is only a teenager. Her grandfather also does not want her getting involved in cases, often reminding her "We are not detectives with warrant badges, we are innkeepers with brooms." Many of the stories, with three clear suspects, keep the audience guessing until the truth is ultimately explained.

Cast

Primary characters 
 Shelby Woo (Irene Ng): Main protagonist of the show, who solves mysteries and is an overachiever. She lives in Cocoa Beach, Florida in Seasons 1-3 and moved to Boston with her grandfather in Season 4. Despite Shelby being portrayed as a teenager, in reality, Ng was 21 when the series began and was close to 25 by the end of the series. Shelby's parents aren't seen though are mentioned in episode "Hot Seats" to be in China after Shelby receives a package from them.
 Michael "Mike" Woo (Pat Morita): Shelby's loving grandfather and legal guardian who is looking after Shelby while her parents are in China. He's a practical retired detective with the San Francisco PD. Mike doesn't want Shelby to solve mysteries because he's afraid that she'll get hurt.
 Cindy Ornette (Preslaysa Edwards): Shelby's perky best friend in Cocoa Beach; like Shelby, she likes getting involved in cases. Cindy is close to her cousin Wayne.
 Noah Allen (Adam Busch): Shelby's other best friend in Cocoa Beach; he doesn't like getting involved in cases. Noah wants to be an actor.
 Detective Whit Hineline (Steve Purnick): Works at the Cocoa Beach PD; he is Shelby's sarcastic former boss and doesn't like her interfering in his investigations. Detective Hineline does care about Shelby's well-being.
 Detective Sharon Delancey (Ellen David): Works at the Boston PD, and is Shelby's new boss. While she isn't thrilled with Shelby's help, she is more accepting of it than Detective Hineline was.
 Angela "Angie" Burns (Eleanor Noble): Shelby's new best friend from Boston who replaces Cindy; very good at science and applies that knowledge in certain cases.
 Vincent "Vince" Rosania (Noah Klar): Shelby's other new best friend from Boston who replaces Noah; originally a suspect in one of Shelby's first cases in Boston. He becomes Shelby's love interest.

Recurring characters 
 Detective Muldoon (Angelo Tsarouchas): heavy set detective who assists Shelby in a few cases in Detective Delancey's absence; does needlepoint
 Will (Joshua Harto): works at CJ's burger joint where Shelby and her friends hang out in Cocoa Beach; known for breaking things or coming up with poorly-thought-out ideas
 Christie Sayers (Jennifer Finnigan): Shelby's nemesis who is determined to solve a case before she does and fails each time; only appears in season 4

Episodes

Series overview 
<onlyinclude>

Season 1 (1996)

Season 2 (1997)

Season 3 (1997–98)

Season 4 (1998–99)

Broadcast 
On December 28, 2011, TeenNick aired the episode "The Smoke Screen Case" on The '90s Are All That block. The series began airing on a more permanent basis in late October 2015 on The '90s Are All That's successor block, The Splat.

Home media 
All 12 episodes from seasons 1 and 2 are available for purchase on the iTunes Store and Amazon Video. Season 2 is available for purchase on Vudu.

On November 24, 2014, the entire series was released on DVD exclusive to Amazon.com in region 1.

References

External links 

 

1990s American mystery television series
1990s Nickelodeon original programming
1996 American television series debuts
1996 Canadian television series debuts
1999 American television series endings
1999 Canadian television series endings
Canadian mystery television series
English-language television shows
Television series about teenagers
Television series by Cookie Jar Entertainment
Television shows set in Florida
Television shows set in Boston
Television shows filmed in Montreal
Chinese American television